The Ministry of Culture and Sports is the government department of Greece entrusted with preserving the country's cultural heritage, promoting the arts, and overseeing sport through the subordinate General Secretariat for Sports. The incumbent minister is Lina Mendoni.

History
This ministry was established in 1971 as the Ministry of Culture and Sciences and it was renamed the Ministry of Culture on 26 July 1985. On 7 October 2009, it was merged with the Ministry of Touristic Development to form the Ministry of Culture and Tourism. It ceased to exist on 21 June 2012, when the Ministry of Tourism was re-established and the culture portfolio was absorbed by the Ministry of Education, Lifelong Learning and Religious Affairs to form the Ministry of Education, Religious Affairs, Culture and Sports. The Ministry of Culture and Sports was re-established on 25 June 2013. On 27 January 2015, it was again merged with the education ministry to form the Ministry of Culture, Education and Religious Affairs. On 23 September 2015, the culture and education portfolios were restored as separate ministries.

List of Ministers for Culture and Sciences (1971–1985)

List of Ministers for Culture (1985–2009)

List of Ministers for Culture and Tourism (2009–2012)

List of Ministers for Education, Religious Affairs, Culture and Sports (2012–2013)

List of Ministers for Culture and Sports (2013–2015)

List of Ministers for Culture and Sports (since September 2015)

External links
 Official website

Culture and Sports
Lists of government ministers of Greece
Greek culture
Greece
1971 establishments in Greece
Greece, Culture and Tourism